Naxaithong is a rural district of Vientiane Prefecture, Laos.

References

Populated places in Vientiane Prefecture